Tylonycteris bat coronavirus HKU4 (Bat-CoV HKU4) is an enveloped, positive-sense single-stranded RNA virus mammalian Group 2 Betacoronavirus that has been found to be genetically related to the Middle East respiratory syndrome-related coronavirus (MERS-CoV) that is responsible for the 2012 Middle East respiratory syndrome coronavirus outbreak in Saudi Arabia, Jordan, United Arab Emirates, the United Kingdom, France, and Italy.

Transmission
The exact means of transmission to humans is not yet well known. However, it has been demonstrated that betaCoV's including HKU4 have the propensity to recombine and cause interspecies transmission. However, this is not seen in Group C betaCov's to which MERS-CoV is most closely related.

See also
 Severe acute respiratory syndrome (SARS)
 Tylonycteris
 Pipistrellus
 Human coronavirus HKU1
 Human coronavirus OC43
 Pipistrellus bat coronavirus HKU5
 RNA virus
 Positive/negative-sense
 London1 novel CoV/2012

References

External links
  London1-nCoV-2012 phylogenetic tree
 Coronaviruses
 Viralzone: Betacoronavirus
 Virus Pathogen Database and Analysis Resource (ViPR): Coronaviridae

Merbecovirus
Animal viral diseases
Bat diseases
Bat virome